Christian Palin (born 1 February 1978) is the lead singer of the metal bands Random Eyes and Panorama. He is also the former lead singer of the neoclassical metal band Adagio, among others.

The son of a Finnish father and Uruguayan mother, Palin was born in Montevideo, Uruguay. He moved to Finland with his family in 1998 and in 1999 served his 12-month mandatory military service in Tikkakoski as a corporal.

Palin signed with Adagio in 2008, and Archangels in Black was the first album to feature him on vocals. He parted ways with the band in February 2010.

Discography

References

External links 
 Random Eyes – Invisible review at Angelic Warlord – Christian Metal Resource
www.imperiumi.net
Levyarvostelut
www.roadrunnerrecords.com

1978 births
Living people
Singers from Montevideo
Uruguayan people of British descent
21st-century Uruguayan male singers
Adagio (band) members